Daeil High School is a private, general boys high-school located in Deungchon-dong, Gangseo-gu, Seoul, South Korea.

School history 
 September 26, 1972: School legally recognized as Daeil High School, founding president Kim Seoung-min appointed
 March 3, 1973: First admissions (600 students)

External links
Official website

High schools in Seoul
Private schools in South Korea
Educational institutions established in 1972
Boys' schools in South Korea